Oldham was a parliamentary constituency centred on the town of Oldham, England. It returned two Members of Parliament (MPs) to the House of Commons of the Parliament of the United Kingdom. The constituency was created by the Great Reform Act of 1832 and was abolished for the 1950 general election when it was split into the Oldham East and Oldham West constituencies.

The Oldham constituency was where Winston Churchill began his political career. Although taking two attempts to succeed, in the 1900 general election Churchill was elected as the member of Parliament for Oldham. He held the constituency for the Conservative Party until he defected from them in defence of free trade in 1904. He then represented the Liberal Party as MP for the seat until the 1906 general election.

Boundaries
Though centred on Oldham (the town), the constituency covered a much broader territory; Shaw and Crompton, Royton, Chadderton and Lees all formed part of this district, though these were each granted individual urban district status at a local government level in 1894.

1885–1918: The existing parliamentary borough, and so much of the municipal borough of Oldham as was not already included in the parliamentary borough.

Members of Parliament 

Notes:-
 a J M Cobbett's political affiliations are complicated.  He had stood unsuccessfully on an all-Radical 'plague on both your houses' slate with John Fielden in 1847. He was elected in 1852 as the Radical half of an explicit Radical-Tory alliance. At the 1857 election he was opposed by two Liberals and denied that he had sold out to Palmerston, asserting that the Liberal Chief Whip had no confidence in him.  In 1865 he stood unsuccessfully in conjunction with a Conservative, opposed by two Liberals.  Nonetheless, from 1852 to 1865 outside Oldham he was generally taken to be a Liberal.  From 1872 to his death in 1877 he sat as a Conservative (but one calling for annual Parliaments and manhood suffrage)
 b Churchill changed his party allegiance in April 1904.
 c Denniss changed his surname to Bartley-Denniss, when he was knighted in 1922.

Elections

Elections in the 1830s

 
 
 

Cobbett's death caused a by-election.

Elections in the 1840s

Elections in the 1850s

 
  

Duncuft's death caused a by-election.

  

 
  

Platt's death caused a by-election.

Elections in the 1860s
Fox's resignation caused a by-election.

Elections in the 1870s
Platt's death caused a by-election.

 

Cobbett's death caused a by-election.

Elections in the 1880s

Elections in the 1890s

Ascroft’s death and Oswald's resignation caused a by-election.

Elections in the 1900s

Elections in the 1910s

General Election 1914–15:

Another General Election was required to take place before the end of 1915. The political parties had been making preparations for an election to take place and by the July 1914, the following candidates had been selected; 
Liberal: W. H. Sumnervell
Unionist: John Radcliffe Platt, Edmund Bartley-Denniss
Labour: William C. Robinson

Elections in the 1920s

Elections in the 1930s

General Election 1939–40

Another General Election was required to take place before the end of 1940. The political parties had been making preparations for an election to take place and by the Autumn of 1939, the following candidates had been selected; 
Conservative: Hamilton Kerr
Liberal National: John Dodd
Labour: Leslie Hale, D A Mainds
Liberal: James Taylor Middleton

Elections in the 1940s

References

Sources 
 Boundaries of Parliamentary Constituencies 1885–1972, compiled and edited by F. W. S. Craig (Parliamentary Reference Publications 1972)
 British Parliamentary Election Results 1832–1885, compiled and edited by F.W.S. Craig (The Macmillan Press 1977)
 British Parliamentary Election Results 1885–1918, compiled and edited by F.W.S. Craig (Macmillan Press 1974)
 British Parliamentary Election Results 1918–1949, compiled and edited by F.W.S. Craig (Macmillan Press, revised edition 1977)
 Who's Who of British Members of Parliament: Volume I 1832–1885, edited by M. Stenton (The Harvester Press 1976)
 Who's Who of British Members of Parliament, Volume II 1886–1918, edited by M. Stenton and S. Lees (Harvester Press 1978)
 Who's Who of British Members of Parliament, Volume III 1919–1945, edited by M. Stenton and S. Lees (Harvester Press 1979)
 Who's Who of British Members of Parliament, Volume IV 1945–1979, edited by M. Stenton and S. Lees (Harvester Press 1981)

Parliamentary constituencies in North West England (historic)
Constituencies of the Parliament of the United Kingdom established in 1832
Constituencies of the Parliament of the United Kingdom disestablished in 1950
History of the Metropolitan Borough of Oldham
Politics of the Metropolitan Borough of Oldham